Mira Rai (born 31 December 1988) is a Nepalese trail runner and sky runner. She has participated in many international competitions and has won numerous awards. She was the winner of 2017 National Geographic Adventurer of the Year.

Biography
She has participated in some of the world’s most challenging trail races.

Early life
Mira Rai hails from a remote village in Bhojpur, in the east of the country. Growing up, her family struggled to meet everyday necessities through farming. She left school at age 12 to help her parents in daily household chores, and because her family could not afford her education. She regularly walked up and down the mountainous terrain to collect water and go to market.
At the age of 14 she left home in the middle of the night, without telling her parents, to join the Maoist insurgency when they came recruiting through her village. As she was a minor, when the civil war came to an end she was ineligible for integration into the Nepal Army and was subsequently discharged. After returning home she dreamed of doing something more with her life to support her family, and traveled to Kathmandu to pursue karate and running.

Career
She was a good runner, but didn’t know what ultra-running was when she participated in her first ultra-marathon, the 50 km Himalayan Outdoor Festival trail race. One morning when she was running in the hills surrounding Kathmandu, she met a group who were training on the same trails. After running together for some time, they asked her to meet them the following week for another run. When she arrived for that run, she found it was the start point of the 50 km race. Despite being unprepared, without carrying proper food or water, or wearing technical running clothes, she won the race, and caught the attention of race organizers with her positive attitude and dedication to the sport.

After more intensive training for trail running, with her mentor Richard Bull of Trail Running Nepal, she began to travel overseas to participate in international ultra-trail running competitions, where she quickly became a well known name, winning one race after another and breaking several records. In early 2016 she suffered a knee injury during competition in the United Kingdom and had to take some time off from international competition to recover. During that time, she turned her attention to promoting trail running across Nepal, and helping to train other promising young female athletes from rural Nepal to complete on the international stage. She has organized many trail races in Kathmandu, and also her native Bojpur, to promote the sport among Nepali youth. She has been featured in both national and international media, which have covered her life from a remote and rural village to a national hero. In a patriarchal society, she has become an inspiration to many girls across the country.

In 2017 Mira re-joined the competitive ultra-trail running world, with her first competition in September 2017 at the 120 km Ben Nevis Ultra Trail Race in Scotland, UK, where she won the race and set a new course record in a time of 14 hours and 24 minutes. She is a professional trail runner, and part of the Salomon Running team.

Achievements
These are her main results.

References

External links
Mira Rai profile at Trail Running Nepal
The Mira Rai Initiative  charitable foundation

Living people
1988 births
Nepalese female long-distance runners
Nepalese mountain runners
Female ultramarathon runners
Nepalese sky runners
Trail runners
Asia Game Changer Award winners
People of the Nepalese Civil War
People from Bhojpur District, Nepal
Rai people